Roxas Airport (Hiligaynon: Hulugpaan sang Roxas, Tagalog: Paliparan ng Roxas)  is a domestic airport serving the general area of Roxas City and the province of Capiz, in the Philippines. The airport is currently classified as a Class 1 principal airport, by the Civil Aviation Authority of the Philippines, a body of the Department of Transportation that is responsible for the operations of most minor and domestic airports serving various parts of the country.

Airlines and destinations

Gallery

See also
List of airports in the Philippines

References

External links

Airports in the Philippines
Buildings and structures in Roxas, Capiz
Transportation in the Visayas